The Jaguar XJ (X308) is a full-size luxury saloon manufactured and marketed by Jaguar Cars for years 1997—2003 across two generations and featuring Jaguar's AJ-V8 and Jaguar's independent rear suspension.  It was the third and final evolution of the XJ40 platform which had been in production since 1986.

Exterior

The X308 kept much of the same exterior styling as its predecessor, carrying its rounded four-headlamp bonnet, low roofline, sloping tail, and wrap-around rear light clusters. From the front, the two generations can be differentiated by the shape of the indicator lenses (rectangular on the X300, oval on the X308), and also by the shape of the fog lamps and lower valance air intake (both of which are more rounded on the X308). The front and rear bumpers were both changed along with the taillights which had red/clear lenses rather than red/grey lenses. The grill surround and badging was slightly changed. The headlight fixtures also included forward parking lights housed with the brights, new to X308.

Interior

The biggest change to the interior on the X308 was to the dashboard, which had remained essentially the same since the original XJ40 with only detail changes over the years.  The rectangular instrument binnacle gave way to three deeply recessed dials similar in style to the recently introduced Jaguar XK8.  The new fascia also allowed for the restoration of a proper glove compartment, which had been lost when the original XJ40 dash had been retrofitted with a passenger side airbag.  Door trim and the design of the center console were also slightly revised.

Mechanicals
Having discontinued production of both the AJ16 inline-six and V12 engines, Jaguar offered only its newly designed V8 engine (named the AJ-V8.) It was available in either 3.2 L or 4.0 L form, although certain markets (such as the United States) only received cars powered by the 4.0 L version. The 4.0 L version was also supercharged in certain models.

No manual gearbox or limited slip differential option were available for any models. Computer-controlled active suspension was available as a feature named "Computer Active Technology Suspension" (CATS).

Models
Instead of the Daimler marque being used in certain markets, the equivalent "Vanden Plas" models were sold under the Jaguar name.

XJ8
The base XJ8 came standard with more equipment than had been fitted to entry-level XJs in the past, including leather upholstery, alloy wheels, and air conditioning. The door mirrors and door handles are body-coloured.  The radiator grille, windscreen and rear window surrounds, boot lid plinth, and rain gutters were chromed, while the window frames remained matte black. Interior wood trim is walnut. Rear badging reads "XJ8".

For the home market in September 2000, Jaguar began badging the XJ8 model as "XJ Executive", and fitted as standard rain-sensing wipers, a CD player, cruise control, and rear parking sensors.

Sport
The Sport model was equipped only with the 3.2 L normally aspirated engine, except Australia and the US that had the 4.0 L normally aspirated V8. It offered stiffer suspension, sportier seating and interior colour combinations, and wider/larger wheels than the XJ8. The windscreen and rear window surrounds were painted matt black, as were the rain gutters and window frames for European markets (the US retains chrome surrounds). The radiator grille has metallic grey vertical slats. Rather than a chrome radiator grille surround, the Sport uses a body-coloured surround. Rear badging reads "XJ Sport".

Sovereign

The Sovereign represented the highest luxury specification for Jaguar models, sitting next to the XJR, which provides the ultimate performance. Sovereigns featured more elaborate/expensive wood veneer, commonly highly figured burr walnut; with window control/ashtray trim panels also done in wood  veneer as opposed to plastic in other models. The Leather is also of a higher quality and often features contrasting piping, with seats being of the traditional fluted style. The suspension setup was biased towards touring and the wheels were normally 16" or 17" to provide high profile tyres for additional ride quality. Computer Active Technology System adaptive suspension was also offered as a rare option.

Externally a Sovereign can be distinguished by the complete use of highly polished steel/chrome work around windows and rear light clusters; as well as polished radiator grill and boot garnish. The cars are simply badged as "Sovereign" with no mention "XJ".

Jaguar also released a long wheelbase version of the Sovereign in 1998. The difference being that the car is around 4 inches longer, with the rear doors being noticeably longer than the front; there is also correspondingly taller rear roof profile to provide additional headroom.

XJR

The XJR is powered by the supercharged version of the 4.0 L V8. It is also equipped with sport suspension, wider wheels and tyres, and matte-black exterior window trim (except in the US market, where the XJR was given chrome window frames and rain gutters.) Like the Sport model, the XJR has a body-coloured radiator grille surround, but with a stainless-steel mesh insert rather than the normal vanes. Other exterior touches include the "XJR" rear badging and larger exhaust outlets.

Available on late XJR models was an "R1" performance option. This included 18" BBS wheels, larger Brembo brakes with cross-drilled rotors, and re-tuned suspension.

In 2001, to commemorate the 100th anniversary of Sir William Lyons' birth, Jaguar produced five hundred examples of a special-edition model named the "XJR 100". Only available in the Anthracite exterior colour with charcoal leather upholstery, the interior is trimmed with contrasting red stitching and birdseye maple. It is fitted with a leather-covered sports steering wheel and MOMO shift knob. The XJR 100 uses the Brembo brakes otherwise found on the R1-equipped XJR and 19-inch "Montreal"-style wheels manufactured by BBS.

SE
Produced only in 2002, the SE (Special Equipment) model was fitted with more equipment than the original base model, and was offered at a competitive price. The rear badging read "SE", and the cars were fitted with reverse parking sensors as standard.

Daimler/Vanden Plas 

The top-of-the-range Daimler marque (sold as the Vanden Plas model in certain markets like the United States) features softer suspension and all available luxury features. They are cosmetically differentiated by the traditional Daimler fluted radiator grille surround and fluted boot-lid plinth.

The Daimler and Vanden Plas cars were also available with the supercharged engine otherwise found only in the XJR. This model was named the Daimler Super V8. In the US market, this combination was available only as a special order though 2001 (with these cars identifiable by their "Vanden Plas Supercharged" rear badging). For US model years 2002 and 2003, the equivalent Super V8 model was then offered. These supercharged long-wheelbase variants were also fitted with Jaguar's proprietary "Computer Active Technology System" (CATS) adaptive suspension. The "Sports" setup from the XJR application, however, is replaced by a "touring" set-up, exclusive to supercharged Daimler and Vanden Plas variants. It is softer and more compliant than the XJR's Computer Adaptive Technology Suspension system.

Production numbers

Reception 
Motor Trend described the X308 as, "a masterful blend of British luxury and American muscle," continuing, "this car makes you feel elegant and gets sweeter by the mile," calling it a "musclecar in a tuxedo." Brian Cooley, an editor of Roadshow by CBS, called the X308 his "favorite modern car." In 2018, Motorious claimed the X308 provides the most luxurious ride of any car ever produced due to its status as the "last steel-bodied XJ and the first to feature a modern V8 drivetrain, the perfect concoction of classic and contemporary Jaguars," continuing that, "this is a car that fits anywhere it goes, be that the supermarket car park, a country hotel or even outside the Casino de Monte-Carlo." Jeremy Clarkson of Top Gear remarked that the X308 is "faster, in the real world, than a Ferrari F355... fastest saloon I've ever seen," the epitome of luxury, beauty, and performance.

References

External links

XJ
Flagship vehicles
Full-size vehicles
Sedans
Rear-wheel-drive vehicles
Cars introduced in 1997
2000s cars
Luxury vehicles